Sinte Romani (also known as Sintitikes, Manuš) is the variety of Romani spoken by the Sinti people in Germany, France, Austria, Belgium, the Netherlands, some parts of Northern Italy and other adjacent regions. Sinte Romani is characterized by significant German influence and is not mutually intelligible with other forms of Romani. The language is written in the Latin script.

Overview 
The name Romani derives from řom, the historical self-designation of speakers of the Romani language group. Romani is sometimes written as Romany (in English), but native speaking people use the word Romani for the language. Historically, Romani people have been known for being nomadic, but today only a small percentage of Romani people are unsettled due to forced assimilation and government interventions.

Sinte Romani is a dialect of Romani and belongs to the Northwestern Romani dialect group, which also includes Finnish Kalo. Sinti is the self-designation of a large Romani population that began leaving the Balkans early on in the dispersion of the Romani language group, from the end of the 14th century on, and migrated to German-speaking territory. Sinti in France typically also speak Sinte Romani but refer to themselves as Manuš (or Manouche).

Today Sinte is mainly spoken in Germany, France, Northern Italy, Switzerland, Serbia, and Croatia, with smaller numbers of speakers in Austria, the Czech Republic, and the Netherlands. Sinti form the largest sub-group of Romani people in Germany, and Germany, in turn, is home to the largest number of Sinte Romani speakers. Nearly all Sinte Romani speakers speak multiple languages, the dominant language of the country they live in being the most common.

Phonology 
Sinte Romani is a non-tonal language with 25 consonants, 6 vowels, and 4 diphthongs.

Vocabulary 
Example vocabulary for Sinte Romani is given below, based on samples from Austria, Italy, and Albania collected in the Romani Morpho-Syntax Database (RMS) hosted by the University of Manchester. Words that show the influence of historical German vocabulary are marked with an asterisk (*).

* Words borrowed from historical German

** Words borrowed from the modern dominant languages (i.e., German, Italian, or Albanian)

See also
 Sinti
 Romani language

References

Sources
 Daniel Holzinger, Das Romanes. Grammatik und Diskursanalyse der Sprache der Sinte, Innsbruck 1993
 Norbert Boretzky/Birgit Igla, Kommentierter Dialektatlas des Romani, Teil 1, Wiesbaden: Harrassowitz, 2004

Further reading
 Acton, T. A., & Mundy, G. (1997). Romani culture and Gypsy identity. Hatfield: University of Hertfordshire. 
 Peter Bakker, Donald Kenrick et al.: What is the Romani language? Series: Interface Collection. Centre de recherches tsiganes and University of Hertfordshire Press, Hatfield (Hertfordshire) 2000, p. 58.
 Gilbert, J. (2014). Nomadic peoples and human rights. New York, NY: Routledge.
 Guy, W. (2001). Between past and future: The Roma of Central and Eastern Europe. Hatfield: University of Hertfordshire Press.
 
 Matras, Y. (2002). Romani: A linguistic introduction. Cambridge: Cambridge University Press.
 Matras, Y. (2010). Romani in Britain: The afterlife of a language. Edinburgh: Edinburgh University Press.  
 Saul, N., & Tebbutt, S. (2004). The role of the Romanies: Images and counter-images of "Gypsies"/Romanies in European cultures. Liverpool: Liverpool University Press.

External links
 A brief overview (in German)
 A 1903 textbook in Sinti by F. N. Finck, (in German), at the Internet Archive: 
 Biblical Recording in Sinte Romani
 RMS: Romani Morpho-Syntax Database
 

Romani in Austria
Romani in France
Romani in Germany
Romani in Italy
Northern Romani dialects
Sinti
Sinti in Austria
Sinti in Germany
Languages of the Netherlands